Riitta Liisa Salin (née Hagman, born 16 October 1950) is a retired Finnish sprinter who specialized in the 400 metres.

She won the gold medal in 1974 European Athletics Championships with a new world record time 50.14, which remains the Finnish record. At the 1976 Summer Olympics Salin finished seventh.

Riitta Salin is the sister of former ice hockey player Matti Hagman.

References 

1950 births
Living people
Athletes from Helsinki
Finnish female sprinters
Olympic athletes of Finland
World record setters in athletics (track and field)
European Athletics Championships medalists
Athletes (track and field) at the 1976 Summer Olympics
Olympic female sprinters